The C35 class was a class of steam locomotives built by Eveleigh Railway Workshops between 1914 and 1923 for the New South Wales Government Railways in Australia. Despite their elegant, somewhat English looking appearance, they suffered a long period of teething troubles and were poor performers, especially on long climbs.

In service
They took over hauling The Fish, from Sydney Central to Mount Victoria in June 1918 and the Caves Express on the same route in 1932. To operate this, 3506, 3526 and 3535 were painted in Caledonian Blue to match the carriages.

After being replaced by 36 class locomotives on Southern and Western services, they were transferred to operate North Coast and Northern Tablelands express and mail trains until replaced by diesels in the 1950s. The first was withdrawn in February 1959. During the last years of service, they were confined to working both passenger and freight trains north of Gosford on the Main North line. The last was withdrawn in August 1968.

Modifications
In May 1935, an ACFI feedwater heater was fitted to 3508. It was apparently not a success as it was removed in 1939 and no other member was so fitted. 

From December 1937, the class was rebuilt with heavier frames, rebalanced driving wheels, new boilers and new cabs with more shelter, replacing their Great Western Railway look.

Preservation

See also
NSWGR steam locomotive classification
3526

References

4-6-0 locomotives
Railway locomotives introduced in 1914
35
Standard gauge locomotives of Australia